The Lola B11/40 is an open-top Le Mans Prototype (LMP) built by Lola Cars International. It is the first car to be designed to the new Automobile Club de l'Ouest (ACO) LMP2 "low cost formula" where cars will be powered exclusively by production series engines with a cap of €75,000 on the engine and €325,000  – €400,000 for a complete car. Engine options that will be available include BMW, Ford, HPD, Jaguar, Nissan and Toyota.

Development

Announced on 21 July 2010, the B11/40 is a Carbon fibre open-top monocoque race car features an all-carbon bodykit, quick-release removable rear bodywork which includes a stabilisation fin on the engine cover which is a safety requirement of the new regulations.

References

External links
 Lola Cars International

B11 40
Le Mans Prototypes
Aston Martin vehicles
24 Hours of Le Mans race cars
Sports prototypes